The Will to Kill is the eighth studio album by Florida death metal band Malevolent Creation.
The U.S. and UK album covers are alternate.

Track listing

Personnel
Malevolent Creation
 Kyle Symons - Vocals
 Rob Barrett - Lead guitar
 Phil Fasciana - Rhythm guitar
 Gordon Simms - Bass
 Justin DiPinto - Drums

Additional musician(s)
 James Murphy - Guitar solo on "Assassin Squad"
 Shawn Ohtani - Guitar solo on "All That Remains"

Production
 Jean-Francois Dagenais - Mixing
 Shawn Ohtani - Engineering
 Travis Smith - Cover art
 Robert Cardenas - Layout

Malevolent Creation albums
2002 albums
Albums with cover art by Travis Smith (artist)